Ghedini is a surname. Notable people with the surname include:

 Giorgio Federico Ghedini (1892–1965), Italian composer
 Giuseppe Ghedini (1707–1791), Italian painter
 Niccolò Ghedini (1959–2022), Italian lawyer and politician

See also
 Ghidini

Italian-language surnames